The 1990 NCAA Division I softball season, play of college softball in the United States organized by the National Collegiate Athletic Association (NCAA) at the Division I level, began in February 1990.  The season progressed through the regular season, many conference tournaments and championship series, and concluded with the 1990 NCAA Division I softball tournament and 1990 Women's College World Series.  The Women's College World Series, consisting of the eight remaining teams in the NCAA Tournament and held in Oklahoma City at ASA Hall of Fame Stadium, ended on May 27, 1990.

Conference standings

Women's College World Series
The 1990 NCAA Women's College World Series took place from May 23 to May 27, 1990 in Oklahoma City.

Season leaders
Batting
Batting average: .483 – Meg Thompson, 
RBIs: 57 – Rhonda King-Randolph, 
Home runs: 13 – Rhonda King-Randolph, 

Pitching
WINS: 34-17 – Lisa Kemme, 
ERA: 0.27 (7 ER/181.0 IP) - Sue Rybczyk, 
Strikeouts: 327, Michele Granger,

Records
Freshman class scoreless innings streak:
63.0 – Heather Compton, UCLA Bruins; March 2-May 9, 1990

Sophomore class single game triples:
3 – Michelle Shean, ; March 10, 1990

Senior class assists:
222 – Tiffany Cornelius,

Awards
Honda Sports Award Softball:
Lisa Fernandez, UCLA

All America Teams
The following players were members of the All-American Teams.

First Team

Second Team

Third Team

References